The men's 4 × 400 metres relay event at the 1960 Olympic Games took place between September 7 and September 8.

Results

Heats

The fastest three teams in each of the four heats advanced to the semifinal round.

Heat one

Heat two

Heat three

Heat four

Semifinals

The fastest three runners in each of the two heats advanced to the final round.

Heat one

Heat two

Final

Key: WR = world record; DNF = did not finish

References

M
Relay foot races at the Olympics
Men's events at the 1960 Summer Olympics